The Tiger of Eschnapur, or in original German, Der Tiger von Eschnapur, is a 1959 West German-French-Italian adventure film directed by Fritz Lang. It is the first of two films comprising what has come to be known as Fritz Lang's Indian Epic; the other is The Indian Tomb (Das Indische Grabmal). Fritz Lang returned to Germany to direct these films, which together tell the story of a German architect, the Indian maharaja for whom he is supposed to build schools and hospitals, and the Eurasian dancer who comes between them.

Prior works
Lang's Indian epic is based on work he did forty years earlier on a silent version of Das Indische Grabmal. He and Thea von Harbou co-wrote the screenplay, basing it on von Harbou's novel of the same name. Lang was set to direct, but that job was taken from him and given to Joe May. Lang did not control the final form of that earlier version which was a commercial and critical failure at the time, although its reputation has grown in recent years.

Released in 1921, the original version of Das Indische Grabmal had a running time of 3 hours and was released in two parts. For the remake, Lang also divided the story into two parts that each run about 100 minutes, a length modern audiences can more easily accept.

Plot
Architect Harold Berger arrives in India and travels to the kingdom ruled by Maharajah Chandra, for whom he will be building schools and hospitals. En route to the Maharajah's palace, Berger travels with a temple dancer named Seetha, who has also been invited to the palace. En route, he saves her life when her caravan is attacked by a man-eating tiger.

Seetha, whose father was European, has inadvertently caused the Maharajah to become infatuated while he watched her dancing at a religious ceremony. She and the architect, however, have secretly begun to fall in love. This leads to tension between Chandra and Berger, further exacerbated by scheming courtiers, including the Maharaja's older brother. They believe that Chandra's potential marriage to the dancer could become a pretext for toppling his reign.

Seetha and Berger escape together into the desert, just before Berger's sister and her husband, an architect who works with Berger, arrive in Eschnapur. Chandra informs them that he now wants a tomb to be built before any further work can begin on the previously commissioned schools and hospitals. After discovering that Berger and Seetha have escaped, Chandra issues a command for Berger to be killed, and Seetha returned alive
for burial in the tomb after its completion. The film ends with the couple stranded in the desert after their horses expire, just as a sandstorm begins.

(The story continues in the sequel film, The Indian Tomb)

Cast

Debra Paget as Seetha
Paul Hubschmid as Harold Berger
Walter Reyer as Chandra
Claus Holm as Dr. Walter Rhode
Luciana Paluzzi as Baharani
Valéry Inkijinoff as Yama
Sabine Bethmann as Irene Rhode
René Deltgen as Prince Ramigani
 Jochen Brockmann as Padhu
Richard Lauffen as Browana
 Jochen Blume as Asagara
 Helmut Hildebrand as Ramigani's servant
Guido Celano as General Dagh (uncredited)
Victor Francen as Penitent (uncredited)
Panos Papadopoulos as Courier (uncredited)
 Angela Portaluri as Peasant woman (uncredited)

Production
The film was shot on location in India with a predominantly German cast. Lang was able to get permission from the Maharana of Udaipur to shoot at many locations that were normally barred to Western film crews. One of these was the floating Lake Palace seen much later in Octopussy.

Interiors were shot at the Spandau Studios in Berlin with sets designed by the art directors Helmut Nentwig and Willy Schatz.

Releases
The two films were edited down into one 95-minute feature courtesy of American International Pictures and released in the US in 1959 as Journey to the Lost City—with Seetha's dance scenes heavily trimmed, courtesy of the Hays Office. The negatives of Fritz Lang's original films were thought to be lost, but a set was rediscovered. Fantoma Films restored them in the DVD format, producing one disc for each film. The discs contain both German and English dialogue tracks, plus other extras. They were released by Image Entertainment in 2001.

Trivia
 Another film titled Der Tiger von Eschnapur was released in Germany in 1938. It too was based on Thea von Harbou's novel Das Indische Grabmal (The Indian Tomb). The film was directed by Richard Eichberg and written by him along with Hans Klaehr and Arthur Pohl.

References

External links

 "Come On, Baby, Be My Tiger" - article about the several versions of the film
 DVD Savant
 Artur-Brauner-Archive at the Deutsches Filmmuseum in Frankfurt (German), containing the production files for this movie

1959 films
1959 adventure films
1959 romantic drama films
German adventure films
West German films
French drama films
Italian drama films
1950s German-language films
Films based on German novels
Films based on works by Thea von Harbou
Films directed by Fritz Lang
Films scored by Michel Michelet
Films set in India
Films with screenplays by Fritz Lang
Remakes of German films
Films shot at Spandau Studios
Films shot in India
Films shot in Rajasthan
1950s Italian films
1950s French films
1950s German films